Mohamed Abdulwahab Ahmed Shaban (born on 13 November 1989) is a Bahraini professional football player who plays for the Bahraini national football team.

Career
He debuted internationally on 4 August 2019 at the WAFF Championship in Iraq in a match against Jordan in a 0–1 victory.

He had recently last appeared at the 2022 FIFA World Cup qualifying match against Hong Kong in a 4–0 victory on 15 June 2021.

On 21 November 2021, Abdulwahab was included final-23 squad for the 2021 FIFA Arab Cup.

References

External links
 
 

1989 births
Living people
Bahraini footballers
Bahrain international footballers
Association football midfielders
Riffa SC players
East Riffa Club players
Hidd SCC players
Al-Ahli Club (Manama) players